The House of Lies may refer to:
The House of Lies (1916 film)
The House of Lies (1926 film)
House of Lies, 2012 television series